The Ward Baking Company Building was an industrial facility in Prospect Heights, Brooklyn, New York.  It was constructed in 1911 by George S. Ward as a baking plant. 

According to the Ward Baking Company, the Ward Building housed the first "sanitary and scientific bakery in America.” The building housed hundreds of workers who produced 250,000 loaves of bread per day.

The Ward Building later became a storage facility.  It was demolished in 2007 to make way for Pacific Park.

Building
The Ward Building stretched from the south side of Pacific Street to the north side of Dean Street, between Carlton and Vanderbilt Avenues, in Prospect Heights, Brooklyn.

The Ward Building was six stories tall, with a facade of glazed white terra cotta tiles. Grecian-inspired arches ran the length of the building, front and back. Ornamental detailing ran the length of the building. At one end stood a  smoke stack, previously used in the baking process.

Historical significance
In 1911, George S. Ward, President of the Ward Baking Company, built the Ward Building to accommodate a large industrial bakery.  

A 1921 Ward Bakery Publication,The Story of our Research Products described Ward as having “the courage and the pioneer spirit to erect the first sanitary and scientific bakery in America.” It also described the Ward Building as “the snow-white temple of bread-making cleanliness.”

We were gone for 30 days and when we returned the plans were completed,” Ward related to a journalist from The Baseball Magazine in 1926. “They were made literally in mid-Atlantic.” As evidenced from the graceful arches, the architects had been inspired by Greco-Roman designs.

According to Ward, “We invested two million dollars in our New York venture before we turned a wheel or gained the market for a single loaf of bread,” he told The Baseball Magazine. “The day we started our great plants we loaded a hundred wagons with bread and sent them out, instructing our salesmen to give the bread away as samples. The next day we sent them out again, this time to sell bread. We have been selling bread ever since.

References

External links
Ward Bakery is Toast
Demolition Begins For Atlantic Yards Project

Industrial buildings and structures in Brooklyn
Prospect Heights, Brooklyn
1911 establishments in New York City
2007 disestablishments in New York (state)
Industrial buildings completed in 1911